Dupax del Sur, officially the Municipality of Dupax del Sur,  is a 2nd class municipality in the province of Nueva Vizcaya, Philippines. At the 2020 census, it had a population of 21,224 people.

Etymology
The name "Dupax" comes from the Isinai word "dopaj". By "dopaj" the Isinais, who are the first inhabitants of Dupax, meant "to lie down in complete relaxation." 
According to folklores that have survived from generation to generation, even long before the founding fathers established the municipality, the site of what eventually became the "poblacion", or town proper of Dupax, used to serve as a roaring camp for primitive hunters from surrounding tribal settlements. After hard days of hunting in nearby mountains, the hunters would repair the camp where they would feast on their catch of wild animals. When they were through with their brand of merrymaking "they would lie down and relax completely" before getting up again to return to their respective home. The camping area, which was a plain or a valley, was near their hunting grounds that later, they decided to settle on it together with their families and the town of Dopaj was established.

In time, the town's name metamorphosed into Dupax, after the arrival of the Spaniards who, for convenience, substituted the letter "x" in lieu of letter "j" for easy pronunciation.

History
The first known settlers were the Mala-ats. They are said to be ancestors of the Isinais who now inhabit the locality. Before 1725, two tribal groups, the Mala-atas and Isinais already lived in the vicinity of Dupax and in June 1726, Spanish Missionaries of the Order of Saint Augustine arrived in the locality. However it was on April 22, 1731, that Father Nicholas Norbante and Agustin de San Juan formally founded Dupax.

The original town of Dupax was the largest municipality of the province of Nueva Vizcaya in terms of land area. The first head of the town, was Mandalito, an Ilongot. Eventually three prominent mem representing the three tribal districts were appointed, namely: Dayag, who headed the Mala-ats; Tiun Pising, who headed the Igorots, and Bartolo, who headed the Ilongots. Years passed more and more influx of Ilocanos, Ifugaos, Igorots and other ethnic groups continued to migrate from other provinces before and after the turn of the century.

As early as 1928, during the mayoral term of Inocencio Suzon, attempts were made to transfer the municipal seat to Malasin but the plan did not materialize. Because of some conflicts where to place the seat of the municipality, the Congress passed into law Republic Act 6372 otherwise known as "An Act Creating the Municipality of Dupax del Sur from the Municipality of Dupax in the province of Nueva Vizcaya", sponsored by Congressman Benjamin B. Perez in the Philippine House of Representatives and Senator Leonardo B. Perez in the Philippine Senate. President Ferdinand Marcos amended some sections and signed it into law with the promulgation of Presidential Decree 586 on November 26, 1974, which paved the way for the division of Dupax into two municipalities: Dupax del Norte and Dupax del Sur.

Geography

Barangays
Dupax del Sur is politically subdivided into 19 barangays. These barangays are headed by elected officials: Barangay Captain, Barangay Council, whose members are called Barangay Councilors. All are elected every three years.

 Abaca
 Bagumbayan
 Balzain
 Banila
 Biruk
 Canabay
 Carolotan
 Domang
 Dopaj
 Gabut
 Ganao (Lingad)
 Kimbutan
 Kinabuan
 Lukidnon
 Mangayang
 Palabotan
 Sanguit
 Santa Maria
 Talbek

Climate

Culture
The town hosts the San Vicente Ferrer Church (Dupax del Sur), which is also known as the Dupax Church or Dopaj Church. The heritage structure is an 18th-century Baroque church located at Barangay Dopaj. The parish church, under the advocation of Saint Vincent Ferrer, is under the jurisdiction of the Roman Catholic Diocese of Bayombong. The church complex has been declared a National Cultural Treasure by the National Museum of the Philippines in July 2001. Its construction was finished in 1776, making it older than other heritage structures in the entire country.

An earlier church structure of modest design might have been erected before 1773 and records tell that the structure may have been reused as a schoolhouse after the erection of the present church at around 1773 by Father Manuel Corripio, OP. By this time, the church of Tuguegarao by Father Antonio Lobato, OP was already standing. Like the earlier Tuguegarao church, Father Corripio had the church of Dupax made of bricks and even had two kilns made near the church complex, one for firing bricks and the other for preparing lime. The current façade, which mimics the silhouette of the earlier Tuguegarao Cathedral and is reflected on the churches of Bayombong and Bambang in Nueva Vizcaya, dates back to 1776 while each level of the bell tower bears inscription of the years when which it must have been completed. Its original titular patron is the Nuestra Señora del Socorro but was replaced by San Vicente Ferrer soon after the mission was returned to the Dominicans.

The façade is divided by cornices into horizontal segments of plastered brick. The first level features a semicircular arched main portal embellished with clay insets. The main doorway is flanked on both sides by two blind windows with an embossed image of the Holy Eucharist. The second story features a niche and two windows framed by embossed carvings. The triangular pediment is divided into two horizontal sections with the lower half pierced with a deeply recessed oculus and the upper part featuring a relief of a cross. The entire pediment is capped by undulating cornices and seven finials, with the central finial crowned with a cross.

To the left of the façade is the four-level, unplastered, rectangular bell tower. The base features saint's niches similar to that found on the second level of the façade while the second level features long, narrow windows framed with bracket columns. The tower is capped with a decorative parapet and a small cupola surmounted by a cross. The church plaza is enclosed by a low perimeter wall and a replica of an earlier atrial cross.

Two focal points inside the church are the pillars supporting the choir loft. The two, white-washed pillars are embellished with reliefs of cherubs, shells, florals and arabesques. Similar motifs can also be found on the baptistery. The original main altarpiece and pulpit are still intact but the heads of the images in the altarpiece are believed to be replicas of the ivory ones stolen over the course of the church's history.

The Dupax del Sur church is an officially declared National Cultural Treasure of the Philippines. In 2015, the Dampol Bridge was also declared as a National Cultural Treasure, where both heritage sites were collectively named by the National Commission for Culture and the Arts as the San Vicente Ferrer Church Complex and Dampol Bridge of Dupax Del Sur. The declaration remains as the only National Cultural Treasure declaration in the entire Nueva Vizcaya province.

Due to the outstanding cultural value of the town of Dupax del Sur, many scholars have been pushing for its inclusion in the Tentative List of UNESCO World Heritage Sites of the Philippines.

Demographics

Economy

Government
Dupax del Sur, belonging to the lone congressional district of the province of Nueva Vizcaya, is governed by a mayor designated as its local chief executive and by a municipal council as its legislative body in accordance with the Local Government Code. The mayor, vice mayor, and the councilors are elected directly by the people through an election which is being held every three years.

Elected officials

Education
The Schools Division of Nueva Vizcaya governs the town's public education system. The division office is a field office of the DepEd in Cagayan Valley region. The office governs the public and private elementary and public and private high schools throughout the municipality.

References

External links

[ Philippine Standard Geographic Code]
Philippine Census Information
Local Governance Performance Management System
RA 6372 - Creating the Municipality of Dupax del Sur
PD 586 - Amending RA 6372, inserting new sections

Municipalities of Nueva Vizcaya